The 2009 Evening Standard British Film Awards, held on 1 February 2009 honoured the best British and Irish films of 2008.

Best film
Hunger
Frost/Nixon
Unrelated

Best Director
Stephen Daldry – The Reader
Danny Boyle – Slumdog Millionaire
Lenny Abrahamson – Garage

Best Actor (tie)
Michael Sheen – Frost/Nixon and Pat Shortt – Garage
Michael Fassbender  – Hunger

Best Actress
Tilda Swinton – Julia
Samantha Morton – Mister Lonely
Kate Winslet – The Reader, Revolutionary Road

Best Screenplay
Martin McDonagh – In Bruges
Mark O’Halloran – Garage
Peter Morgan – Frost/Nixon

Technical achievement
Mark Digby (production designer) – Slumdog Millionaire
Roger Deakins (cinematographer) – No Country for Old Men, In the Valley of Elah, The Reader with Chris Menges
Joe Walker (editor) – Hunger and The Escapist

Most Promising Newcomer
Joanna Hogg (director) – Unrelated
Dev Patel (actor) – Slumdog Millionaire
Rupert Wyatt (writer-director) – The Escapist

Peter Sellers Award for Comedy
Sally Hawkins – Happy-Go-Lucky
Eddie Marsan – Happy-Go-Lucky
Chris Waitt – A Complete History of My Sexual Failures

Alexander Walker Special Award
Mike Leigh

References

External links
Hunger named best picture at Evening Standard British Film awards

2008 film awards
Independent Film Awards
Evening Standard Awards